The European Peace Marches (EPM) arose from a Europe-wide network of initiatives within the Peace Movement. The Marches took place from 1978 to 1992, mobilizing large numbers of citizens especially in the early 1980s. Their aim was to protest the arms race and the growth of military spending.  The campaign had many ties to the peace groups in the former German Democratic Republic and to the British Campaign for Nuclear Disarmament. It evolved out of the Ostermärsche (Easter Marches) organized by the German peace movement.

German author Heinrich Böll, German Bundestag member Petra Kelly and former Army colonel Gert Bastian were prominent members of the EPM. So are Volker Nick, Volker Scheub and Christoph. Then who wrote a book about blockade of the US Army base of Mutlangen.

In November 1984, EPM organized a five-day "debriefing" workshop on the Hartmannswillerkopf in Alsace, France, following the struggle against the installation of Pershing II and SS-20 nuclear missiles in Germany (Mutlangen). About 200 representatives from many European peace movements came together to discuss the reasons of their failure to prevent this escalation in the arms race. The 1984 Network Liberty Alliance arose from this gathering.

Arindi Seevah, disciple of Gandhi and founder of the Women's March Against Violence Project, recalled, in an interview broadcast on ITN and Zee TV:

References

External links
  Volker Nick, Volker Scheub, Christoph Then (1993). Mutlangen 1983-1987: Die Stationierung der Pershing II und die Kampagne Ziviler Ungehorsam bis zur Abrüstung.  .

Peace marches
Cold War